The 1916 Copa Ibarguren was the 4th. edition of this National cup of Argentina. It was played by the champions of both leagues, Primera División and Liga Rosarina de Football crowned during 1916.

Racing (Primera División champion) faced Rosario Central (Liga Rosarina champion) at its own venue, Estadio Racing Club, located on Alsina and Colón streets in Avellaneda.  Racing thrashed Rosario Central 6–0.

Qualified teams 

Note

Match details

References

i
i
1916 in Argentine football
1916 in South American football
Football in Avellaneda